The Perijá lichen gecko (Gonatodes lichenosus) is a species of lizard in the Sphaerodactylidae family native to Venezuela.

References

Gonatodes
Reptiles described in 2010